In 1989-1990, 14 European teams competed for the two available positions in the 1991 Rugby World Cup.

Preliminary

Pool 1 
(played in France)

{| class="wikitable"
|-
!width=165|Team
!width=40|Played
!width=40|Won
!width=40|Drawn
!width=40|Lost
!width=40|For
!width=40|Against
!width=40|Difference
!width=40|Points
|- bgcolor=#ccffcc align=center
|align=left| 
|3||3||0||0||98||25||+63||9
|- align=center
|align=left| 
|3||2||0||1||42||57||-15||7
|- align=center
|align=left| 
|3||1||0||2||49||74||-25||5
|- align=center
|align=left| 
|3||0||0||3||31||64||-33||3
|}

Pool 2 
 Round 1

Round 2

Round 3

Preliminary final

Round 2
Final Standings
{| class="wikitable"
|-
!width=165|Team
!width=40|Played
!width=40|Won
!width=40|Drawn
!width=40|Lost
!width=40|For
!width=40|Against
!width=40|Difference
!width=40|Points
|- bgcolor=#ccffcc align=center
|align=left| 
|3||3||0||0||110||30||+80||9
|- bgcolor=#ccffcc align=center
|align=left| 
|3||2||0||1||80||68||+12||7
|- align=center
|align=left| 
|3||1||0||2||61||79||-18||5
|- align=center
|align=left| 
|3||0||0||3||41||115||-74||3
|}

Round 3
Final Standings
{| class="wikitable"
|-
!width=165|Team
!width=40|Played
!width=40|Won
!width=40|Drawn
!width=40|Lost
!width=40|For
!width=40|Against
!width=40|Difference
!width=40|Points
|- bgcolor=#ccffcc align=center
|align=left| 
|3||3||0||0||83||38||+45||9
|- bgcolor=#ccffcc align=center
|align=left| 
|3||2||0||1||85||42||+43||7
|- align=center
|align=left| 
|3||1||0||2||34||61||-27||5
|- align=center
|align=left| 
|3||0||0||3||30||91||-61||3
|}

 and  qualified to 1991 Rugby World Cup, Pool 1 and Pool 4, respectively.

Bibliography 
 Francesco Volpe, Valerio Vecchiarelli (2000), 2000 Italia in Meta, Storia della nazionale italiana di rugby dagli albori al Sei Nazioni, GS Editore (2000) .
 Francesco Volpe, Paolo Pacitti (Author), Rugby 2000, GTE Gruppo Editorale (1999).

1991
European
1989–90 in European rugby union
1990–91 in European rugby union